Edward Lee King (December 26, 1892 – September 16, 1967) was an American professional baseball outfielder. He played in Major League Baseball (MLB) from 1916 to 1922 for the Pittsburgh Pirates, New York Giants, and Philadelphia Phillies.

King drove in the final run of the 1922 World Series with a double for his victorious team, the Giants. It came in his only at-bat in a World Series game. His perfect 1.000 batting average and 2.000 OPS are World Series records.

He had 294 hits in a seven-year career, with a batting average of .247 along with 15 home runs and 144 RBI.

Another outfielder with exactly the same name, Edward Lee King, born two years later, also played Major League Baseball, both men going by their middle names, Lee.

External links

1892 births
1967 deaths
Major League Baseball outfielders
Baseball players from West Virginia
New York Giants (NL) players
Pittsburgh Pirates players
Philadelphia Phillies players
People from Hundred, West Virginia
People from Shinnston, West Virginia
Adrian Fencevilles players
Wheeling Stogies players
Toledo Mud Hens players
Portland Beavers players
Galveston Sand Crabs players
San Antonio Bears players
Cumberland Colts players
Uniontown Cokers players
Fairmont Black Diamonds players